Bathysolea is a genus of soles native to the eastern Atlantic and western Indian oceans.

Species
There are currently four recognized species in this genus:
 Bathysolea lactea Roule, 1916
 Bathysolea lagarderae Quéro & Desoutter, 1990
 Bathysolea polli (Chabanaud, 1950)
 Bathysolea profundicola (Vaillant, 1888) (Deepwater sole)

References

Soleidae
Marine fish genera
Taxa named by Louis Roule